Princeton Plasma Physics Laboratory (PPPL) is a United States Department of Energy national laboratory for plasma physics and nuclear fusion science. Its primary mission is research into and development of fusion as an energy source. It is known in particular for the development of the stellarator and tokamak designs, along with numerous fundamental advances in plasma physics and the exploration of many other plasma confinement concepts.

PPPL grew out of the top-secret Cold War project to control thermonuclear reactions, called Project Matterhorn. The focus of this program changed from H-bombs to fusion power in 1951, when Lyman Spitzer developed the stellarator concept and was granted funding from the Atomic Energy Commission to study the concept. This led to a series of machines in the 1950s and 60s. In 1961, after declassification, Project Matterhorn was renamed the Princeton Plasma Physics Laboratory.

PPPL's stellarators proved unable to meet their performance goals. In 1968, Soviet's claims of excellent performance on their tokamaks generated intense scepticism, and to test it, PPPL's Model C stellarator was converted to a tokamak. It verified the Soviet claims, and since that time, PPPL has been a worldwide leader in tokamak theory and design, building a series of record-breaking machines including the Princeton Large Torus, TFTR and many others. Dozens of smaller machines were also built to test particular problems and solutions, including the ATC, NSTX, and LTX.

PPPL is located on Princeton University's Forrestal Campus in Plainsboro Township, New Jersey.

History

Formation
In 1950, John Wheeler was setting up a secret H-bomb research lab at Princeton University. Lyman Spitzer, Jr., an avid mountaineer, was aware of this program and suggested the name "Project Matterhorn".

Spitzer, a professor of astronomy, had for many years been involved in the study of very hot rarefied gases in interstellar space. While leaving for a ski trip to Aspen in February 1951, his father called and told him to read the front page of the New York Times. The paper had a story about claims released the day before in Argentina that a relatively unknown German scientist named Ronald Richter had achieved nuclear fusion in his Huemul Project. Spitzer ultimately dismissed these claims, and they were later proven erroneous, but the story got him thinking about fusion. While riding the chairlift at Aspen, he struck upon a new concept to confine a plasma for long periods so it could be heated to fusion temperatures. He called this concept the stellarator.

Later that year he took this design to the Atomic Energy Commission in Washington. As a result of this meeting and a review of the invention by scientists throughout the nation, the stellarator proposal was funded in 1951. As the device would produce high-energy neutrons, which could be used for breeding weapon fuel, the program was classified and carried out as part of Project Matterhorn. Matterhorn ultimately ended its involvement in the bomb field in 1954, becoming entirely devoted to the fusion power field.

In 1958, this magnetic fusion research was declassified following the United Nations International Conference on the Peaceful Uses of Atomic Energy.  This generated an influx of graduate students eager to learn the "new" physics, which in turn influenced the lab to concentrate more on basic research.

The early figure-8 stellarators included : Model-A, Model-B, Model-B2, Model-B3. Model-B64 was a square with round corners, and Model-B65 was a racetrack configuration. The last and most powerful stellarator at this time was the 'racetrack' Model C (operating from 1961 to 1969).

Tokamak
By the mid-1960s it was clear something was fundamentally wrong with the stellarators, as they leaked fuel at rates far beyond what theory predicted, rates that carried away energy from the plasma that was far beyond what the fusion reactions could ever produce. Spitzer became extremely skeptical that fusion energy was possible and expressed this opinion in very public fashion in 1965 at an international meeting in the UK. At the same meeting, the Soviet delegation announced results about 10 times better than any previous device, which Spitzer dismissed as a measurement error.

At the next meeting in 1968, the Soviets presented considerable data from their devices that showed even greater performance, about 100 times the Bohm diffusion limit. An enormous argument broke out between the AEC and the various labs about whether this was real. When a UK team verified the results in 1969, the AEC suggested PPPL convert their Model C to a tokamak to test it, as the only lab willing to build one from scratch, Oak Ridge, would need some time to build theirs. Seeing the possibility of being bypassed in the fusion field, PPPL eventually agreed to convert the Model C to what became the Symmetric Tokamak (ST), quickly verifying the approach.

Two small machines followed the ST, exploring ways to heat the plasma, and then the Princeton Large Torus (PLT) to test whether the theory that larger machines would be more stable was true. Starting in 1975, PLT verified these "scaling laws" and then went on to add neutral beam injection from Oak Ridge that resulted in a series of record-setting plasma temperatures, eventually topping out at 78 million Kelvin, well beyond what was needed for a practical fusion power system. Its success was major news.

With this string of successes, PPPL had little trouble winning the bid to build an even larger machine, one specifically designed to reach "breakeven" while running on an actual fusion fuel, rather than a test gas. This produced the Tokamak Fusion Test Reactor, or TFTR, which was completed in 1982. After a lengthy breaking-in period, TFTR began slowly increasing the temperature and density of the fuel, while introducing deuterium gas as the fuel. In April 1986, it demonstrated a combination of density and confinement, the so-called fusion triple product, well beyond what was needed for a practical reactor. In July, it reached a temperature of 200 million degrees, far beyond what was needed. However, when the system was operated with both of these conditions at the same time, a high enough triple product and temperature, the system became unstable. Three years of effort failed to address these issues, and TFTR never reached its goal. The system continued performing basic studies on these problems until being shut down in 1997. Beginning in 1993, TFTR was the first in the world to use 50/50 mixtures of deuterium-tritium. In 1994 it yielded an unprecedented 10.7 megawatts of fusion power.

Later designs
In 1999, the National Spherical Torus Experiment (NSTX), based on the spherical tokamak concept, came online at the PPPL.  Laboratory scientists are collaborating with researchers on fusion science and technology at other facilities, both domestic and foreign. Staff are applying knowledge gained in fusion research to a number of theoretical and experimental areas including materials science, solar physics, chemistry, and manufacturing.

Odd-parity heating was demonstrated in the 4 cm radius PFRC-1 experiment in 2006. PFRC-2 has a plasma radius of 8 cm. Studies of electron heating in PFRC-2 reached 500 eV with pulse lengths of 300 ms.

In 2015, PPPL completed an upgrade to NSTX to produce NSTX-U that made it the most powerful experimental fusion facility, or tokamak, of its type in the world.

In 2017, the group received a Phase II NIAC grant along with two NASA STTRs funding the RF subsystem and superconducting coil subsystem.

Directors
In 1961 Gottlieb became the first director of the renamed Princeton Plasma Physics Laboratory.
 1951-1961: Lyman Spitzer, director of Project Matterhorn
 1961-1980: Melvin B. Gottlieb
 1981-1990: Harold Fürth
 1991-1996: Ronald C. Davidson
 1997 (January–July): John A. Schmidt, interim director
 1997-2008: Robert J. Goldston
 2008–2016: Stewart C. Prager
 2016–2017: Terrence K. Brog (interim)
 2017–2018: Richard J. Hawryluk (interim)
 2018–present: Sir Steven Cowley, 1 July 2018

Timeline of major research projects and experiments

Other experiments 
International Thermonuclear Experimental Reactor (ITER)

Plasma science and technology
Beam Dynamics and Nonneutral Plasma
Laboratory for Plasma Nanosynthesis (LPN)

Theoretical plasma physics
DOE Scientific Simulation Initiative
U.S. MHD Working Group
Field Reversed Configuration (FRC) Theory Consortium
Tokamak Physics Design and Analysis Codes
TRANSP Code
National Transport Code Collaboration (NTCC) Modules Library

Transportation
Tiger Transit's Route 3 runs to Forrestal Campus and terminates at PPPL.

See also
Project Sherwood
National Compact Stellarator Experiment (NCSX)

References

External links

 Project Matterhorn Publications and Reports, 1951-1958 Princeton University Library Digital Collections
 

Plainsboro Township, New Jersey
Princeton University
United States Department of Energy national laboratories
Federally Funded Research and Development Centers
 
1961 establishments in New Jersey
Research institutes in New Jersey